The National Standards of the Republic of China (CNS) is the national standard of Taiwan, officially the Republic of China. These standards were established in 1946, and administered by the Bureau of Standards, Metrology and Inspection ("BSMI") of the Ministry of Economic Affairs of Taiwan. These standards are divided into 26 numbered categories. Applying the National Standards is voluntary unless authorities in charge cite any parts of the standards as laws and regulations. By the end of 2003, more than 15000 national standards have been issued. Although the Republic of China was removed in 1950 from the International Organization for Standardization (ISO) for failure to pay membership dues accordingly, there are still many National Standards translated from ISO standards into Chinese. A few standards also have English versions, but in case of any divergence of interpretation, the Chinese text shall prevail.

Selected Sections
Each standard has a general number and may be prefixed with "CNS", such as CNS 11296. The general numbers, English names and any similar ISO standards of some standards are listed below:

See also 
 Taiwan Accreditation Foundation

References

External links 
 Bureau of Standards, Metrology and Inspection: http://www.bsmi.gov.tw
 CNS On-line: https://www.cnsonline.com.tw/?locale=en_US

Standards
Economy of Taiwan